The Glenmaggie Dam is a concrete block foundation gravity dam with 14 radial arm gates across the Macalister River, located near , Central Gippsland, in the Australian state of Victoria. The dam's purpose includes irrigation, the generation of hydro-electric power, water supply and conservation. The impounded reservoir is called Lake Glenmaggie.

Location and features
Construction of the Glenmaggie Dam commenced in 1919, was completed in 1927 and constructed by the State Rivers and Water Supply Commission of Victoria. The Macalister Irrigation District covers about  around the Macalister and Thomson rivers, extending from Lake Glenmaggie to Sale. It comprises two areas: the Maffra-Sale Irrigation Area to the north of the Thomson River and the Central Gippsland Area (including the Nambrok-Denison Soldier Settlement district) to the south.

The Glenmaggie Dam wall, which creates the Glenmaggie Lake, is a mass concrete overfall dam with irrigation outlets on both sides of the river serving irrigation channels. The central portion is an overfall spillway. The dam wall was raised in 1958 by the addition of gates; stabilised using ground anchors in 1989; and upgraded in 2003 to enable it to withstand overtopping.

Flooding
In June 2007, the Macalister catchment experienced record flooding. Repairs totaling around 4 million were completed after the June and November 2007 floods.

See also

 Irrigation in Australia
 List of dams and reservoirs in Victoria

References

Dams in Victoria (Australia)
West Gippsland catchment
Rivers of Gippsland (region)
Dams completed in 1927
Hydroelectric power stations in Victoria (Australia)